"Good People" is a protest song written and performed by Jack Johnson. It is the fourth track on the album In Between Dreams and was released as a single on May 9, 2005. Though the song has a positive and relaxing sound, it is a critic of contemporary television, especially with regard to frequent violence, and its effect on society. The song is similar to the song "Cookie Jar" from Johnson's previous album On and On, which also draws attention to the issue, but with a more explicit protest and melancholic sound.

Commercial performance
"Good People" peaked at number one on the Billboard Adult Alternative Songs chart in the United States. It also became a minor hit in the United Kingdom, peaking at number 50 on the UK Singles Chart. It additionally reached number 25 in New Zealand and number 92 in the Netherlands. The single was certified gold by the Recording Industry Association of America.

Track listings
Canadian CD single
 "Good People"
 "No Other Way" (acoustic version)
 "Butter Nut"
 "Good People" (live video from the Kokua Festival)

UK 7-inch single and European CD single
 "Good People"
 "No Other Way" (acoustic version)

UK CD single
 "Good People"
 "No Other Way" (acoustic version)
 "Butter Nut"

UK DVD single
 "Good People" (video)
 "Butter Nut" (live video from the Kokua Festival)
 "Making of In Between Dreams" (filmed at The Mango Tree Hawaii, October 2004)

Charts

Certifications

Release history

References

External links
 

2005 singles
2005 songs
Jack Johnson (musician) songs
Protest songs
Songs written by Jack Johnson (musician)
Song recordings produced by Mario Caldato Jr.